"Make You Happy" is a song by Canadian recording artist Celine Dion, taken from her fourth English-language studio album, Falling into You (1996). Written by Andy Marvel and produced by Ric Wake, "Make You Happy" is a "bouncy" pop song, with influences of reggae and funk. Lyrically, the song talks about Dion pleading someone for commitment in a relationship. "Make You Happy" was released as a promotional single from the album in 1997 in Brazil. Critics commended the song for its catchiness.

Background and release
The album also spawned the huge hits, "Because You Loved Me", "It's All Coming Back to Me Now" and "All by Myself". While releasing "Call the Man" as the album's fifth single in Europe, "Make You Happy" was selected as a promotional single in Brazil, on 7 July 1997. Besides "Make You Happy", the promotional CD single contains four other Dion hits: "Beauty and the Beast, "The Power of Love", "Think Twice" and "When I Fall in Love. The CD single is one of Dion's rarest singles.

Composition and critical reception 
"Make You Happy" was written by Andy Marvel and produced by Ric Wake. Wake has produced many songs from Dion, ever since her "self-titled second English-language studio album" (1992), with the most notable track being "Love Can Move Mountains", to her third English-language studio album (1993), writing the single "Misled", among others. Marvel also arranged, provided guitars, keyboards & drums for the track. "Make You Happy" was recorded at Cove City Sound Studios, The Dream Factory & The Hit Factory.

Lyrically, "Make You Happy" is a pledge of devotion and romantic commitment. It is a bouncy pop tune, as noted by Paul Verna of Billboard, which also has reggae and dance elements. CD Universe praised the track, calling it "a slow, funky number with a catchy chorus".

Formats and track listings
Brazilian promotional CD maxi single
"Make You Happy" 4:31
"Beauty and the Beast" – 4:04
"The Power of Love" – 5:43
"Think Twice" – 4:47
"When I Fall in Love" – 4:20

Credits and personnel
Recording
Recorded at Cove City Sound Studios, The Dream Factory & The Hit Factory.
Mixed at Cove City Sound Studios
Personnel

Songwriting – Andy Marvel
Production – Ric Wake
Programming – Lucas Secon
Arranging – Andy Marvel

Engineering – Terence Dover
Keyboards and drums – Andy Marvel
Guitar – Andy Marvel, Russ DeSalvo
Background vocals – Audrey Martels

Credits adapted from the liner notes of Falling into You, Columbia Records.

References

1996 songs
1997 singles
Celine Dion songs
Columbia Records singles
Songs written by Andy Marvel